Apple products may refer to:

List of apple dishes, prepared foods using apples
Apple#Human consumption, food and non-food products of the apple
Timeline of Apple Inc. products